Maite Lizaso Campos (born 25 October 1983) is a Spanish former football midfielder who played for Real Sociedad and Athletic Bilbao in the Primera División.

Club career
Lizaso spent a decade with Real Sociedad, during which she suffered three serious knee injuries. She transferred to Basque derby rivals Athletic Bilbao in 2014.

Honours
 Athletic Bilbao
 Primera División: 2015–16

References

External links
 Profile at Athletic Bilbao
 Profile at La Liga 

1983 births
Living people
Footballers from the Basque Country (autonomous community)
Spanish women's footballers
Primera División (women) players
Athletic Club Femenino players
People from Zarautz
Women's association football midfielders
Sportspeople from Gipuzkoa